Hasely Thorne Holder  (born April 4, 1986 in Port of Spain) is a Trinidadian footballer.

Career

College and amateur
Holder began his career in Trinidad and Tobago with Queen's Royal College Intercol. While with QRC he helped them win the North Zone Intercol title in 2003. In 2004, he joined San Juan Jabloteh and played with their Under-20 side and was recognized as the league's top keeper.

In 2007, he left the Island to play college soccer for the University of Maryland.  Holder remained at Maryland for one season before transferring to Adelphi University in 2008. While with Adelphi Holder appeared in 47 matches and recorded 19 shutouts. Holder also played for USL Premier Development League club Long Island Rough Riders during both their 2008 and 2009 seasons.

Professional
During the 2011 Major League Soccer preseason Holder went on trial with Philadelphia Union. He made a favorable impression and on March 1, 2011 was signed by the club. During the season he was released, signed by F.C. New York of the third division USL Pro league, and then re-signed by Philadelphia. On November 23, 2011, Holder was waived by Philadelphia.

References

External links
Maryland player profile
Adelphi player profile

1986 births
Living people
Trinidad and Tobago footballers
Maryland Terrapins men's soccer players
Adelphi Panthers men's soccer players
Long Island Rough Riders players
Philadelphia Union players
F.C. New York players
USL League Two players
USL Championship players
Expatriate soccer players in the United States
Alumni of Queen's Royal College, Trinidad
Association football goalkeepers